Euryopis elegans is a species of spiders in the family Theridiidae, the tangle-web spiders.

It is found on the East coast of Australia.

References

External links 
 Euryopis elegans at the Atlas of Living Australia

Theridiidae
Spiders described in 1890
Spiders of Australia